HNLMS Holland was a  protected cruiser of the Royal Netherlands Navy.

Design
Two  single turret guns provided the ship's main armament, and these were augmented by six single  guns and four  single guns. The ship had a complement of 324 men.

Service history
Holland was built at the Rijkswerf in Amsterdam and launched on 4 October 1896. The ship was commissioned on 1 July 1898. She left the port of Den Helder on 7 January  for the Dutch East Indies.

In 1900 the ship together with the coastal defence ship  and the protected cruiser  was sent to Shanghai to safeguard European citizens and Dutch interests in the region during the Boxer Rebellion. A landing party from Holland assisted in the defense of the Shanghai French Concession where many Dutch citizens where present. She and Koningin Wilhelmina der Nederlanden returned in the middle of October that year to the Dutch East Indies.

In 1910 the ship together with  escorted  that had hit a cliff on 31 May while en route to Surabaya. The collision caused the flooding of several compartments of the ship. Damaged as she was, Noordbrabant could continue to steam on her own.

The ship was sent in 1911 again to Shanghai to protect European citizens at the time of the fall of Imperial China. Holland arrived on 4 November that year.

In 1912 she was sent to represent the Dutch queen at the funeral of the Japanese emperor Meiji in Yokohama.

The ships was decommissioned in 1920.

Notes

References
Staatsbegrooting voor het dienstjaar 1903 (2. VI. 5.)

Holland-class cruisers
1896 ships